Blas Pérez González (13 August 1898 – 7 February 1978) was a Spanish politician who served as Minister of Governance of Spain between 1942 and 1957, during the Francoist dictatorship.

References

1898 births
1978 deaths
Interior ministers of Spain
Government ministers during the Francoist dictatorship